Rajeev Sivashankar (born 1967 in Konni, Pathanamthitta) is an Indian novelist and short story writer in Malayalam language. He is from Konni, Pathanamtitta district of the south Indian state of Kerala.

Early life 

At age 12 he won the Mathrubhoomi story writing competition. His story was published in Mathrubhoomi weekly.

Career 

He works in Malayala Manorama (Kottayam) as assistant editor.

At age 45 he resumed writing, producing five novels and a short story collection. His novels are Thamovedam, Pranasancharam, Kalpramanam, Puthrasooktha are his novels. Daivamarathile Ila is his story collection. His notable stories are "Samadhanathinte Vazhikal,kailasanadhan" (published in Samakalika Malayalam), "Reality Show' (Kalakaumudi) and "Daivavicharam, Vivahavarhikam"(Bhashaposhini).

Novels 

 Thamoveadam, published in April 2013 by D. C. Books, is Rajeev's first novel. The novel is based on the growing anarchist cult in the state of Kerala. Set in an imaginary village called Kavathy, the novel discusses the issue through the eccentric main character Viswanathan. He came to kochi and took charge of satanic worship.The first part of the book deals with Viswanathan's childhood and early youth and is set in the fictitious village of Kavathy in Central Travancore. It forms the core of the novel. In the second part, the arena shifts to Cochin and to the world of Black Mass and its followers.
 Pranasancharam –Rajeev's second novel, Pranasancharam, was published in October 2013 by DC books. It discusses the other side of material life and travels through a fantasy-like world.
 Kalpramanam–Rajeev's third novel, published in November 2014 by NBS (SPCS). It discusses environmental issues in Kerala.
 Putrasooktham–Rajeev's fourth novel, published in November 2015 by Green Books.
 Karal Marx's Kailasam veedu–Satirical account of village life. Published in August 2016 by Poorna Publication.
 Maraporul–fiction based on the life of Sri Sankaracharya.
 Kalipakam–fiction based on Kali's story in the Mahabharatha.
 Pennarasu–Celebration of womanhood, statement against the patriarchy
 Divyam–magical realism fantasy happening in Kerala-Tamil Nadu border. Published in February 2019 by Saikatham Books.
 Kunjalithira– Kunjalithira portrays the life of Kunjali maraykkar who made fear in the heart of Portuguese. It depicts the history of a centuries old battle, betrayal, and atrociousness.
 Nagaphanam–Nagaphanam is the voyage through the mystic realms of the nagaclan/race ranging from Ananthan to Kaliyan. It further explores the secret of life, death, and rebirth through the legendary figure Parikshith's being
 Rebecca–Rebecca is an intriguing murder mystery in Malayalam. It is based on a real incident that evoked terror in Kerala. It is a metafiction, where the writer juxtaposes a novel within the novel. Fear, mystery and suspicion in the work will engross the readers from the beginning till the end. The novel belongs to the genre of crime fiction.
 Padam–Aa interesting life of an old lady who lived her life with the Malayalam Film industry 
 Daivamarathile Ila–story collection published in 2015 by DC Books. Includes "Daivavicharam", "Samadhanthinte vazhikal" and "Kailasanadhan"
 Goodam–Eleven story collection published in October 2017.
 Prethasavary–eleven story collection 
 Maranavaridhi–It is a collection of five novelites that depict the uniqueness imparted to one's life by the juxtaposition of fate and coincidence at critical junctures.
 Meesamahathmyam– Detailed study about S.Hareesh's Novel MEESA

Recognition 

Received the Thoppil Ravi Memorial award for best novel(Prana Sancharam) in 2013.

Manoraj Award for best  Shortstories collection (Daiivamarathile Ila) in 2016

References

External links 
 
 
 
 

{{Cite web|url=https://malayalam.news18.com/news/life/interview-with-noted-malayalam-author-rajeev-shivasankar-part-one-rv-525252.html
{{Cite web|url=https://malayalam.news18.com/news/life/exclusive-interview-with-noted-malayalam-author-rajeev-shivasankar-part-two-rv-525259.html

1967 births
Writers from Kerala
People from Pathanamthitta
Living people
Malayalam-language writers